The accusative absolute is a grammatical construction found in some languages.  It is an absolute construction found in the accusative case.

Greek
In ancient Greek, the accusative case is used adverbially with participles of impersonal verbs, similarly to the genitive absolute. For example:

German
In German, a noun phrase can be put in the accusative to indicate that the sentence's subject has the property it describes. For example:

Latin
The accusative absolute is sometimes found in place of the ablative absolute in the Latin of Late Antiquity as, for example, in the writings of Gregory of Tours and Jordanes. This likely arose when the pronunciations of the ablative and accusative singulars merged, since the final -m of the accusative singular was no longer pronounced, having been fading since the Classical era. The accusative absolute is also found with plural nouns whose ablative and accusative are not similar in pronunciation.

Sources

Grammar
Greek grammar
German grammar